Scolichthys is a genus of poeciliid fishes endemic to river basins in Guatemala.

Species
There are currently two recognized species in this genus:
 Scolichthys greenwayi Rosen, 1967
 Scolichthys iota Rosen, 1967

References

Poeciliidae
Endemic fauna of Guatemala
Fish of Guatemala
Freshwater fish of Central America
Freshwater fish genera
Ray-finned fish genera